Eure was a Meurthe-class aviso of the French Navy. She was launched in 1886. She is notable as having claimed territories of the Southern Indian Ocean for France, including the Kerguelen Islands in 1893. She continued to serve in the Pacific until 1901.

Career 
Construction of Eure began in 1886 at the Ateliers et chantiers du Havre. She was part of a 1885 order comprising six other avisos of the same class (Meurthe, Drôme, Aube, Durance, Rance and Manche), designed as mixed sail and steam ships. Eure was launched on 5 April 1886, and commissioned on 14 August 1890 at Rochefort, where she was based.

President Sadi Carnot sent Eure on a mission to claim the French Southern and Antarctic Lands for France. On 1 January 1893, Eure entered Baie de l'Oiseau, North of Kerguelen Islands. Commander Lieutard, the commanding officer, held a ceremony at Port-Christmas the next day, where a copper plaque inscribed « EURE - 1893 » was set. He repeated this in various locations of the archipelago in the following 15 days. Eure continued her claims at île Saint-Paul on 22 January 1893, and at île Amsterdam on 24 January, before returning to Réunion and Madagascar.

In 1897, under Alphonse Lecuve, Eure toured New Guinea and Brisbane, finally arriving at Nouméa in New Caledonia. From then on, she was attached to the French Pacific Fleet.

Eure was decommissioned on 8 March 1901.

Commanding officers 

 1891-1897 : Commander Lieutard
 1897-1898 : Commander Lecuve
 August to October 1899 (interim): Captain Docteur
 1899-1901 : Commander Vallée

Legacy 
A 3.20 franc stamp from the TAAF, depicting Eure was printed on 1 January 1987. 160,000 copies were made..

Sources and references 
 Notes

References

 Bibliography
  (1870-2006)

External links
 Forces maritimes 1718-1920, Service historique de la Défense, p. 65

Ships built in France
1886 ships